Fredon Township School District (FTSD) is a community public school district that serves students in pre-kindergarten through sixth grade from Fredon Township, in Sussex County, New Jersey, United States.

As of the 2020–21 school year, the district, comprised of one school, had an enrollment of 178 students and 21.8 classroom teachers (on an FTE basis), for a student–teacher ratio of 8.2:1.

The district is classified by the New Jersey Department of Education as being in District Factor Group "GH", the third-highest of eight groupings. District Factor Groups organize districts statewide to allow comparison by common socioeconomic characteristics of the local districts. From lowest socioeconomic status to highest, the categories are A, B, CD, DE, FG, GH, I and J.

Students in seventh through twelfth grade for public school attend Kittatinny Regional High School located in Hampton Township, which serves students who reside in Fredon Township, Hampton Township, Sandyston Township, Stillwater Township and Walpack Township. The high school is located on a  campus in Hampton Township, about seven minutes outside of the county seat of Newton. As of the 2020–21 school year, the high school had an enrollment of 843 students and 91.5 classroom teachers (on an FTE basis), for a student–teacher ratio of 9.2:1. Kittatinny Regional High School was recognized as a National Blue Ribbon School of Excellence in 1997-98.

In the wake of protests by parents about the exposure of students to electromagnetic fields and threats by the district to close the school, PSE&G agreed in 2011 to contribute $950,000 towards a construction project that would relocate a playground that had been situated near high voltage lines that pass by the school.

Awards and recognition
Fredon School was awarded the National Blue Ribbon Award for Academic Excellence in November 2001, the highest level of recognition granted to an American school.

Schools
Fredon Township School had an enrollment of 175 students in grades PreK-6 as of the 2020–21 school year.

LeeAnn Smith is the Vice Principal.

Administration
Core members of the district's administration are:
Dr. Brian Kitchin, Superintendent
Rianna Ketch, Business Administrator / Board Secretary

Board of education
The district's board of education, comprised of five members, sets policy and oversees the fiscal and educational operation of the district through its administration. As a Type II school district, the board's trustees are elected directly by voters to serve three-year terms of office on a staggered basis, with either one or two seats up for election each year held (since 2013) as part of the November general election. The board appoints a superintendent to oversee the district's day-to-day operations and a business administrator to supervise the business functions of the district.

References

External links
Fredon Township School District

Data for Fredon Township School, National Center for Education Statistics
Kittatinny Regional High School

Fredon Township, New Jersey
New Jersey District Factor Group GH
School districts in Sussex County, New Jersey
Public elementary schools in New Jersey